Dark Castle may refer to:

Dark Castle, a video game
Dark Castle Entertainment, a film company
Dark Castle (band), music band
Dark Castle (1975) novel written by Anne Mather
Dark Castle (TV Series) a Burmese drama television series